Steven "Steve" Farhood (born 15 February 1957) is an American boxing historian and analyst.

His life
Farhood was born in Brooklyn, New York, to Lebanese parents. Farhood served as editor-in-chief of The Ring and KO Magazine.  He also served as First Vice President of the Boxing Writers Association of America.

Farhood has been an on-air analyst for ESPN, CNN, SportsChannel and USA Network's "Tuesday Night Fights". He currently serves as a commentator on Showtime's ShoBox: The New Generation.

In 2002 Farhood won the Sam Taub Award, which is given for "Excellence in Broadcasting Journalism".

References

1957 births
Living people
People from Brooklyn
American people of Lebanese descent
Boxing writers
The Ring (magazine) people